Barren Fork is a tributary of the Eleven Point River in Oregon County in the Ozarks of southern Missouri.

The source area for the stream lies east of Rover and the stream flows to the northeast passing under U.S. Route 160 to its confluence with the Eleven Point about one mile southeast of Thomasville.

Barren Fork was so named on account of the area being devoid of trees. An alternate name (or pronunciation) was Barn Fork.

See also
List of rivers of Missouri

References

Rivers of Oregon County, Missouri
Rivers of Missouri